Fownes is a surname. Notable people with the surname include:

William Fownes (disambiguation), multiple people
Caspar Fownes (born 1967), Hong Kong horse trainer
George Fownes (1815–1849), British chemist
Rich Fownes (born 1983), English musician
Fownes baronets